Kouki is both a surname and a given name. Notable people with the name include:

 Manel Kouki (born 1988), Tunisian handball player
 Mikko Kouki (born 1967), Finnish actor
, Japanese footballer
 Kouki Takahashi (1987–2011), Japanese motorcycle racer

Japanese masculine given names